Events in the year 1270 in Norway.

Incumbents
Monarch: Magnus VI Haakonsson

Events

Arts and literature

Births
Haakon V of Norway, king (died 1319).

Deaths
Margaret Skulesdatter, queen (born c. 1210).

References

Norway